Sadhoke Railway Station (Urdu and ) is located in Sadhoke town, Gujranwala District of Punjab province, Pakistan.

See also
 List of railway stations in Pakistan
 Pakistan Railways

References

External links
 Official Web Site of Pakistan Railways

Railway stations in Gujranwala District
Railway stations on Karachi–Peshawar Line (ML 1)